Por Siempre is a double music DVD released on May 18, 2013, by Argentine post hardcore band DENY. It was released via Pinhead Records nationwide. A digital version is purchaseable at ITunes.

The material for the DVD was filmed on November 24, 2012, when the band played a show at Groove in Buenos Aires.

The first disc contains songs from previous album Reino de Tormentas (2011) and EP La Distancia (2009), the second disc contains Behind the Scenes material.

Track listing

Personnel 
DENY
 Nazareno Gomez Antolini – Screamed vocals
 Joaquín Ortega – guitars, Clean vocals
 Mateo Sevillano – guitars
 Juan Pablo Uberti – bass guitar, clean vocals
 Agustín Dupuis – drums

Production
 Produced, mixed and mastered by Javier Casas
 Cover artwork design by Alejandro Picardi

References 

2013 live albums
Deny (band) live albums
Pinhead Records albums